Word Realms (abbreviated WR) is a single-player role-playing game designed by Asymmetric Publications, including lead designer Zack "Jick" Johnson and designer Kevin Simmons. The game was released in 2013.

Gameplay
Word Realms gameplay is based on battles between the player character and a computer-controlled non-player character (NPC).  As in the game Bookworm Adventures by PopCap Games, battles consist of the player and the NPC taking turns spelling a word from a set of letters.

There are also eight mini-games.  Each mini-game has a different gameplay mechanism, sometimes similar to battles, and sometimes with some twists or restrictions that make it quite different.

Development
The game was developed over a period of four years, and was funded through Kickstarter.

References

External links
Word Realms Wiki at Coldfront

2013 video games
Linux games
MacOS games
Puzzle video games
Role-playing video games
Video games developed in the United States
Windows games